Ardit Zenuni (born 16 June 1992) is a Swiss footballer of Albanian descent who plays for FC Prishtina Bern.

He has played for FC Thun in the Swiss Super League.

References

Swiss men's footballers
Swiss Super League players
FC Thun players
Swiss people of Albanian descent
Association football midfielders
Swiss people of Kosovan descent
Albanian expatriate sportspeople in Switzerland
1992 births
Living people
People from Thun
Sportspeople from the canton of Bern